Muslim women filmmakers represent a marginalized group of media makers and visual artists coming from countries where the dominant religion is Islam. Some of these nations include Iran, Afghanistan, Indonesia, Pakistan, Egypt, Mali, Palestine and Malaysia.

Muslim women filmmakers create films and videos that deconstruct female stereotypes through a unique, accessible and modern feminist lens. Film and other forms of widely distributed media provide Muslim women a channel to explore and revisit the roles they play within the constraints of societal and religious expectations.

Types of content created by these filmmakers include documentary, feature films, non-fiction or historical films, and television shows.

History 
The emergence of films by Muslim women is a recent 20th century development as more Muslims women have moved from being the subjects of entertainment to being behind the camera. Since the late 1970s, these filmmakers have shared similar views on their societies and histories and have used film to respond to them. The film industry has become a viable and realistic career path for Muslim women. Because of this emergence, more unique films are getting screened in film festivals and distributed in the West. Some of the first female-made films from the Islamic world were created in response to social and political revolutions such as the Islamic revolution in Iran, the rise of the Taliban in Afghanistan, and the secularization of the Turkish government.

Films and filmmakers by country and region

Iran 
It has been a difficult feat for Iranian female directors and filmmakers to break into the male-dominated professional Iranian film industry. Despite strict censorship and control from the Ministry of Culture and Islamic Guidance, several female filmmakers began to emerge in the 1990s. One of these filmmakers is Tahmineh Milani, is a feminist filmmaker from Iran that encouraged the creation of films that reflected women's perspectives and experiences. Female filmmakers in Iran also use the distribution of their films to make the public aware of the different roles Muslim women play in changing political environments. This is most prominently seen in Marjane Satrapi's film and comics Persepolis that illustrate the plight of women during the backdrop of the Iranian revolution. Rakhshan Bani-Etemad is another Iranian filmmaker that focuses on issues of poverty, prostitution, polygamy, divorce, and illicit love through her popular films.

Turkey 
Since the founding of the modern secular Turkish state in 1923, the participation of women in the film industry has been encouraged. As a result, the number of female Turkish directors has increased since the early 2000s. Due to recent national and international funding for the Turkish film industry, low-budget independent films created by women have been increasingly produced. According to the research conducted by women's studies scholar Hulya Ugur Tanriover, since the birth of feature films in Turkey, women made only 1.6% of all films. Between 2004 and 2013, this figure grew to 8.2%. Female made Turkish films fall under the title of independent art house film or popular production. Independent films tend to focus on more taboo topics like incest, rape, motherhood, ethnicity, and women's employment.

North and Sub-Saharan Africa 
There is a diverse collection of films produced by African-Muslim Women filmmakers that reflect on diverse African-Islamic cultures. Islam has been introduced into African cultures at different times, and films by African-Muslim women reflect this integration. These filmmakers comes from countries with majority Muslim populations like Chad, Mali, Niger, Senegal, Tunisia, and Egypt and incorporate television, film, video and documentary to focus on social, cultural and political realities of their African societies. Since there is a lack of funding for African women filmmakers, many produce work outside the continent. Some well known African women filmmakers that comment on the role of women in Islam through their films include Malian animation filmmaker Kadiatou Konaté, who reflects on the relationship between Islam and her Malian culture. Ethiopian filmmaker Salem Mekuria uses her films to examine the interaction between Muslim and Christian refugee women in Sudan.

Malaysia 
The Malaysian film industry began in 1933 with majority of films being entertainment-oriented. Women currently represent a handful of all Malaysian directors and often become producers of films. Despite this shortage, three Malay women filmmakers gained prominence in the 1990s as they addressed socially relevant issues and what they perceived as Islamization through their films. Shuhaimi Baba in particular represented modern Malay women with careers, romances, and complex social relationships. Dr. Gaik Khoo, a film scholar and professor sees Baba's film Selubung as offering a "liberal feminist critique of the extreme nature of fundamentalist Islam".  The only other Malay female filmmaker in charge of writing, producing and directing her own work is Erma Fatima. Fatima's films reflect the moderate stance the Malaysian political party at that time, UMNO, had towards women.

Pakistan 
Pakistani women filmmakers have contributed largely to an effort to document and question their country's socio-political practices and histories. Some of the topic frequently covered by these filmmakers is the effect that religious fundamentalism, gender discriminatory Sharia law, and patriarchal tribal customs have on women and girls. Pakistani women filmmakers have chosen documentary film as their activist tool that investigates the human rights issues that exist in their society. Feminist centered documentary film offers these women a way to express their views to a larger audience in a highly restrictive political environment. One Pakistani female documentarian that has caught the attention of the Western world is Sharmeen Obaid-Chinoy who documents human rights violations against Pakistani women and girls. Another award-winning documentary filmmaker of Pakistani heritage is Deeyah Khan.

Selected filmmakers and filmography  
Tamineh Milani
 Children of Divorce, 1989
 The Hidden Half, 2001
 Two Women, 1999

Deeyah Khan
 White Right: Meeting the Enemy, 2017
 Jihad: A Story of the Others, 2015
 Banaz: A Love Story, 2013

Marjane Satrapi
 Persepolis, 2007
 Chicken with Plums, 2011
 The Voices, 2014
Rakhshan Bani-Etemad
 Kharej az Mahdudeh, 1986
 Zard-e Ghanari, 1988
 Pul-e Khareji, 1989
Shuhaimi Baba
 Selubung, 1993
 Ringgit Kasorrga, 1995
 Pontianak Harum Sundal Malam, 2004
 Tanda Putera, 2013
Erma Fatima
 Hati bukan kristal, 1990
 Daerah shafika, 1999 
 Fantasi, 1994
Kadiatou Konaté
 Des Yeux Pour Pleurer, 1992 
 Circulation Routiere, 1993
 L'Enfant terrible, 1993
Sharmeen Obaid Chinoy
 Saving Face, 2012
 A Girl in the River: The Price of Forgiveness, 2015
 Songs of Lahore, 2015
Zara Mahamat Yacoub 
 Dilemme au féminin, 1994
 Les Enfants de la rue, 1995
 La Jeunesse et l'emploi, 1996

References

Women filmmakers
filmmakers
Film
Lists of women